Marshall Anderson Caffyn (4 November 1892 – 4 January 1966) was an Australian rules footballer who played with South Melbourne in the Victorian Football League (VFL).

Notes

External links 

1892 births
1966 deaths
Australian rules footballers from Victoria (Australia)
Sydney Swans players
Australian military personnel of World War I